The 2002 Uruguay banking crisis was a major banking crisis that hit Uruguay in July 2002. In this, a massive run on banks by depositors (most of them from neighboring Argentina) caused the government to freeze banking operations. The crisis was caused by a considerable contraction in Uruguay's economy and by over-dependence on Argentina (tourism, and construction boom), which experienced a strong phase of an economic meltdown itself in late 2001. In total, approximately 1/3 of the country's deposits were withdrawn and five financial institutions were left insolvent.

According to many sources, the banking crisis could have been avoided if Uruguayan authorities had properly regulated their banks. The Central Bank of Uruguay (BCU) had trusted international banks to regulate themselves properly and was too lenient and slow in responding to the crisis.

Banco Comercial del Uruguay
In 1990, Chemical Overseas Holdings, Inc. (a subsidiary of JPMorgan Chase) together with Dresdner Bank Latinamerika and Credit Suisse First Boston acquired the Banco Comercial del Uruguay (BCU), one of that country's oldest and largest national banks. Over time, Uruguay developed into a large offshore banking center for Argentina and Brazil, largely as a result of its lax banking laws and the predominant view among Argentines that Uruguay was a stable place for their savings.

As a result of the banking crisis, some US$800 million went missing from the BCU alone. In the end, five financial institutions failed and hundreds of thousands of depositors in Uruguay, Argentina, and Brazil were left in dire economic straits after seeing their bank accounts literally disappear.

In January 2005, the Paris-based International Chamber of Commerce ruled that the Uruguayan government would have to pay US$120 million to JPMorgan Chase & Co., Dresdner Bank AG, and Credit Suisse First Boston for failing to maintain the solvency of the BCU.

The crisis underscores the three banks’ difficulty in managing risk in developing countries and dealing with local partners during a time of financial crisis. As a result, a class of BC's former depositors is suing the three international banks and the individual directors they appointed to BC's board to recover the losses suffered as a result of the bank's collapse.

Political crisis management
President Jorge Batlle appointed one of his most respected politicians, Alejandro Atchugarry, as Minister of Economics and Finance, a decision which proved vital in the reestablishment of fundamentals for economic recovery.

See also
South American economic crisis of 2002
1998–2002 Argentine great depression
Latin American debt crisis

References

External links
Banking crisis grips Uruguay (BBC News)
Banking reform will reinforce recovery (The Banker)
Bank Frauds Highlight Lax Controls, Possible Collusion by Officials (Costa Rica Daily Online News Magazine)
J.P. Morgan, Partners Sued Over Lost Argentine Funds (Bloomberg)
Banks risk legal action through involvement with Argentine Rohm brothers (Latin Lawyer: Argentina)
Banco Comercial: Creditor Wins First Round in Legal Battle (Bankrupt.com - Scroll down to find URUGUAY)

Economic history of Uruguay
Banking crisis
Uruguay banking crisis
Banking crises
Jorge Batlle